Sean Fitzharris (born 13 October 1991, in Greenock) is a Scottish football player, who plays for East Kilbride in the Lowland Football League. Fitzharris came through the youth academies of both halves of the Old Firm, Rangers and Celtic.

Club career

Rangers
Fitzharris started his youth career at Rangers and played for their under-13, under-14 and under-15 teams before moving to Celtic, where he played for their under-17 and under-19 age groups.

Celtic
Fitzharris started his career with Celtic, before signing for Greenock Morton on loan after scoring a double against them in a training game at the Lennoxtown training centre.
Fitzharris has featured in Celtic's first team, taking part as a substitute in a friendly victory over Chris Sutton's Lincoln City to help lift the John Reames Memorial Trophy. Fitzharris was a member of the under-19s League and Cup double winning team in season 2009–10 scoring the winning goal in the cup final against Rangers at Hampden Park. He was released at the end of the 2010–11 season.

Morton
Fitzharris signed on loan on 10 September 2010, going straight into the starting line-up the following day in a home defeat against Cowdenbeath. After returning to Celtic at the end of 2010, Fitzharris was signed on a new loan deal on 7 January 2011 until the end of the season. After his release from Celtic, Fitzharris returned to Cappielow to sign a one-year contract with Morton. He was released by Morton in January 2012.

Clyde
After a long spell without a club, Fitzharris signed for Clyde in August 2012 on a one-year deal. Fitzharris went on to agree a contract extension with Clyde at the beginning of May 2013 for a further one year. It was announced on 29 October 2013 that Fitzharris had agreed to a short-term loan deal with non-league side East Kilbride until the end of December 2013. On 12 January 2014, Fitzharris left Clyde and signed for East Kilbride on a permanent deal.

International career
Fitzharris was a regular in Ross Mathie's Scotland U17 squad, scoring three goals in seven appearances.

Personal life
Fitzharris was raised in Inverkip and attended St Columba's High School in Gourock.

References

External links

1991 births
Living people
Footballers from Greenock
Scottish footballers
Celtic F.C. players
Greenock Morton F.C. players
Scottish Football League players
Association football wingers
Rangers F.C. players
Stenhousemuir F.C. players
Clyde F.C. players
Scottish Professional Football League players
East Kilbride F.C. players
Scotland youth international footballers
Lowland Football League players